James Bernard Ramsey (1937 - 2021) was an American econometrician. He was a professor of economics at New York University, and was chair of the economics department between 1978 and 1987.

Ramsey received his B.A. in mathematics and economics from the University of British Columbia in 1963, and his M.A. and Ph.D. in economics from the University of Wisconsin–Madison in 1968 with the thesis "Tests for Specification Errors in Classical Linear Least Squares Regression Analysis", which was later partially published in the Journal of the Royal Statistical Society. It contained the RESET test for misspecification of an econometric model.

After briefly serving as professor at University of Birmingham, England, and Michigan State University, Ramsey moved to New York University as professor of economics and chair of the economics department between 1978 and 1987, where he remained for 37 years until his retirement in 2013.

References

External links 
 
 Website at New York University

1937 births
Living people
Canadian economists
University of British Columbia alumni
 University of Wisconsin–Madison College of Letters and Science alumni
New York University faculty
Fellows of the American Statistical Association